The humpback grouper (Cromileptes altivelis), panther grouper, or (in Australia) barramundi cod is a species of marine ray-finned fish, a grouper from the subfamily Epinephelinae which is in the family Serranidae which also includes the anthias and sea basses. It occurs in the Western Pacific Ocean.

Systematics
The humpback grouper was first formally described as Serranus altivelis in 1828 by the French  zoologist Achille Valenciennes (1794-1865) with the type locality given as Java. In 1839 the English naturalist William John Swainson (1789-1855) placed it in the subgenus Chromileptes, which was later created as a monotypic genus. Swainson spelt the genus as Chromileptes although Fishbase spells it as Cromileptes. Recent molecular analyses based on five genes show that Cromileptes altivelis is included in the same clade as species of Epinephelus. Consequently, the species should be included in Epinephelus as Epinephelus altivelis.

Description
Its particular body shape makes this grouper quite impossible to mix up with other fishes. Its body is compressed laterally and is relatively high. This stocky and strange visual effect is accented by its concave profile and its elongated snout which gives it a humpbacked appearance.

The young have a white background with round black spots and are continuously swimming head down. The adults have a body colouration with variances of grey and beige with darker blotches variable in size on the body. Small black spots cover the whole body.

Distribution and habitat
It is widely distributed throughout the tropical waters of the central Indo-West Pacific region. The humpback grouper lives in clear waters from lagoons and seaward reefs with a preference for dead or silty areas.

In 2012, a single individual was speared in the waters off South Florida, raising fears that it could become invasive, similar to the lionfish.

Feeding and behaviour
The diet of this grouper is based on small fishes and crustaceans. Like the members of its family, the humpback grouper is demersal, solitary (except during mating periods), defends a territory, and is an ambush predator. Its feeding activity is maximal at sunrise and/or at sunset. This species is a protogynous hermaphrodite; in other words, all individuals are born female, with the ability to transform to males as they grow older. Typically, only the most dominant, mature females undergo this transformation in the absence of a dominant male.

Conservation
The humpback grouper has been give Data Deficient status by the IUCN. It is a highly valued food fish, especially in Southeast Asia and in this region it is overexploited. It is bred in aquaculture but there is no evidence that captive breeding has reduced the fishing pressure on wild populations. There is little data on the populations but it is suspected that the population have declined historically and that they continue to do so. Australia has put strong conservation measures in place for this species (no take species in Queensland and possession limits in other states, e.g. Western Australia) but it is lacking protection elsewhere.

In the aquarium
This grouper is kept in marine aquaria.

References

External links

http://www.marinespecies.org/aphia.php?p=taxdetails&id=218193
 

Epinephelini
Fish of Palau
Fish described in 1828
Taxonomy articles created by Polbot